Shanaleshwara Swayambhu Temple dedicated to the worship of Lord Shiva. "Shanaleshwara" means, the sign that is worshiped as Lord Shiva. It is situated at 7 Kilometre away in the Nalas village of Rajpura, Punjab. It is maintained by the ascetic sadhu's of Juna Akhara Foundation.

Temple

Swayambhu 

Inside the Shanaleshwara Temple is the Swayambhu lingam of Lord Shiva. Shiva in the lingam form is believed to be Swayambhu. Swayambhu lingams are Self-created or natural lingams, discovered in the place where they now stand. Most of these are oval- shaped stones. These lingams do not need a prana pratishtha, because a Swayambhu lingam already inherently embodies the power of Shiva.

Importance 
Maha Shivaratri is great festival here, three-days fair is held here every year on Maha Shivaratri and lakhs of people come to the fair to ask for a vow. It has been a tradition that on Maha Shivaratri and in this area (near Rajpura) most of the devotees start their journey on foot from their homes to the Shanaleshwara temple and volunteers serve food to the devotees along the way.

In 1592, Maharaja of Patiala built this temple. Since the 15th century temple has been home to Sadhu's. The Lingam of Shanaleshwara is also known to be Pancha Bhoota. The temple of Shanaleshwara is a place of Guru–shishya tradition.

Timing 

Each row displays several details. Some are there by default, others can be added. These are the available Timings (GMT+5:30):

History 
According to the legend, a cow always showered own milk on the lingam. Nalas region was in jungle, at that time cowherds used to came to feed their cattle's.

Access

Road 
From Rajpura to nalas village travelers can reach this destination by private vehicles.

See also 
 Rajpura
 Swayambhu

References 

Hindu temples in Punjab, India
Shiva temples
Shiva temples in India
Shiva temples in Punjab, India
15th century in religion
Shaivism